August Pieper (14 March 1866 – 25 September 1942) was a German theologian and chairman of the People's Association for Catholic Germany. He is the author of several publications concerning theological, social and political issues. Pieper was born in Eversberg (now a district of Meschede), and died in Paderborn.

References 

1866 births
1942 deaths
People from Meschede
People from the Province of Westphalia
19th-century German Roman Catholic priests
Centre Party (Germany) politicians
Members of the 12th Reichstag of the German Empire
Members of the 13th Reichstag of the German Empire
20th-century German Catholic theologians
German male non-fiction writers
20th-century German Roman Catholic priests